Corsetti is an Italian surname. Notable people with the surname include:

 Brian Corsetti, American television personality, and producer
 Damien M. Corsetti, soldier in the United States Army
 Giancarlo Corsetti (born 1960), Italian macroeconomist and Professor of Macroeconomics at Cambridge University
 Renato Corsetti (born 1941), Italian esperantist 
 Robert Corsetti, Designer and artist. He has painted murals, exhibited fine art paintings and design work for corporate clientele world wide. 

Italian-language surnames